Fyodor Viktorovich Dobronravov (born 11 September 1961) is a Soviet and Russian stage and cinema actor, Honored Artist of Russia (2002), People's Artist of Russia (2011). He is an actor, known for Kadetstvo (TV series 2006 - 2007), Playing the Victim (film) (2006) and The end of the Belle Époque (2015).

Biography 
Fyodor Dobronravov was born in the city of Taganrog, Rostov Oblast, Russian SFSR, Soviet Union. Since his childhood, Dobronravov's dream was to become a circus clown, and as a school student he worked at the open-air summer theater in Gorky Park (Taganrog). After school, since 1978 he made several attempts to enter the State University of Circus and Variety Arts (better known as Moscow Circus School), but without success. After military service Dobronravov had to return to Taganrog and worked as metalworker, furniture mounter, electrician, etc. In 1984 he successfully entered the art college in the city of Voronezh, which he graduated from in 1988. In 1988-1990 he worked at the Voronezh Youth Theater. In 1990 he was invited by Konstantin Raikin to work at Satyricon Theatre in Moscow, which he left in 2000. In 2002, Dobronravov was awarded the title of People's Artist of Russia. Since 2003, he is an actor of Moscow Satire Theatre.

Both sons of Fyodor Dobronravov, Viktor Dobronravov and Ivan Dobronravov are famous Russian actors.

In November 2017 Dobronravov was banned from entering Ukraine for three years for publicly supporting the 2014 Russian annexation of Crimea.

Selected filmography
Playing the Victim (2006)
Liquidation (2007, TV)
Big Difference (2008-2014, TV)
Svaty (season 1-6: 2008-2012, season 7: 2021-2022 TV)
In the Style of Jazz (2010)
All Inclusive (2011)
Moms (2012)
The Snow Queen 2 (2014, voice)
Once Upon a Time (2018)
  Cheburashka (2023 film)

References

External links 
 
 Biography (Russian)
 Фёдор Добронравов: «Путь на сцену открыл Таганрог»
 Федор Добронравов работал  клоуном в Таганроге
 Title of Honored Artist of Russia awarded to Fyodor Dobronravov

1961 births
Living people
Actors from Taganrog
Soviet male actors
Russian male film actors
Russian male television actors
Russian male stage actors
20th-century Russian male actors
21st-century Russian male actors
Honored Artists of the Russian Federation
People's Artists of Russia